Agapanthia japonica is a species of beetle in the family Cerambycidae. It was described by Kano in 1933.

References

japonica
Beetles described in 1933